Justitia mauritiana is a species of spiny lobster, sometimes called the gibbon furrow lobster. It lives in the western Indian Ocean around the Mascarene Islands (Réunion and the type locality, Mauritius), and also around the Hawaiian Islands. Larvae supposed to belong to this species have been reported around the Philippines, the Gilbert Islands and Tahiti. J. mauritiana is also treated as a subspecies of Justitia longimanus.

References

Achelata
Crustaceans described in 1882
Taxa named by Edward J. Miers